Wieniec-Zdrój  is a spa in the administrative district of Gmina Brześć Kujawski, within Włocławek County, Kuyavian-Pomeranian Voivodeship, in north-central Poland.

Wieniec-Zdrój has a population of 120.

References

Villages in Włocławek County
Spa towns in Poland